Aad Knutsson Gjelle (31 December 1768 – 27 February 1840) was a Norwegian cartographer.
Gjelle was from Voss in Hordaland, Norway.  He worked as a public surveyor in Bergen. He was awarded the Order of the Dannebrog (1813).

References

1768 births
1840 deaths
Scientists from Bergen
Norwegian cartographers
Order of the Dannebrog
People from Voss
19th-century Norwegian scientists